Yuck was a rock band that originated in London, England in 2009. The band's final lineup was drummer Jonny Rogoff, guitarist Ed Hayes, bassist Mariko Doi, and lead vocalist/guitarist Max Bloom, who formerly played in the band Cajun Dance Party along with former Yuck member Daniel Blumberg. The band's self-titled debut album was released through Fat Possum on 21 February 2011 in the United Kingdom. Critics have likened the band to bands such as Dinosaur Jr., The Smashing Pumpkins, Pavement, My Bloody Valentine and Sonic Youth.

History
Daniel Blumberg and Max Bloom left their previous group Cajun Dance Party in 2008. They formed Yuck in 2009 in London, England. The group began recording its debut studio album in the summer of the 2010 in London in Max Bloom's parents' house. The band toured with Modest Mouse, Tame Impala, and Unknown Mortal Orchestra.

On 12 April 2012, the band released the non-album track, "Chew" via their official SoundCloud page.

On 15 April 2013, Yuck revealed on their official Facebook page that they would be recording their second album in late April. They also revealed that Daniel Blumberg had left the band to concentrate on releasing his own music.

On 18 July 2013, Yuck released a new song, "Rebirth" and it was made available for free download via their official website.

On 13 August 2013, Huw Stephens debuted Yuck's new single, "Middle Sea" on Radio 1. The new album was revealed to be titled Glow & Behold during an interview with lead singer Max Bloom. It was released on 30 September 2013.

On 5 September 2013, Yuck posted a video of a live recording of New Order's "Age of Consent". The video was recorded 30 August 2013 by Michael Lawrence in RAK Studios, along with some other songs.  This track would become the B-side to the "Middle Sea" single. New member and guitarist Ed Hayes plays on the track.

On 23 January 2014, at a performance in Portland, Oregon, Yuck announced an EP. They played a new song from the EP after the announcement. The Southern Skies EP was released in April 2014.

On 8 July 2015, Yuck released their first single since the release of the Southern Skies EP entitled "Hold Me Closer". On 12 January 2016 the band released a new single, "Hearts in Motion", taken from their third studio album Stranger Things, released on 26 February 2016.

On 15 February 2021 the band posted a message to their Facebook page to announce that they would no longer be touring or making new music together.

Discography

Studio albums
 Yuck (2011)
 Glow & Behold (2013)
 Stranger Things (2016)

EPs
 Southern Skies (2014)

Singles

Members
Final lineup

 Max Bloom – lead guitar, vocals (2009–2021)
 Mariko Doi – bass, vocals (2009–2021)
 Jonny Rogoff – drums (2009–2021)
 Ed Hayes – rhythm guitar (2013–2021)

Former members
 Daniel Blumberg – vocals, rhythm guitar (2009–2013)

References

External links
 Official website

2009 establishments in England
Musical groups disestablished in 2021
British noise rock groups
English indie rock groups
Fat Possum Records artists
Mercury Records artists
Musical groups established in 2009
Musical groups from London
Musical quartets